Carel Anton Fodor or Carolus Antonius Fodor (12 April 1768 – 22 February 1846) was a Dutch pianist, conductor, and the most prominent composer of his generation in the Netherlands, writing in the manner of Joseph Haydn.

He was born in Venlo  He accompanied his older brother, Carolus Emanuel, to Paris at the age of thirteen, to complete his musical studies, perhaps visiting Russia, but returning to Amsterdam in 1790. Concertising in Amsterdam and The Hague, he built a solid reputation in Dutch musical circles as a pianistic virtuoso.

In 1798 he married Geertruida Tersteeg. At the death of Bartholomeus Ruloffs in 1801 he was named conductor of the orchestra of Felix Meritis, which he was to lead for twenty-five years. In the following year he was nominated to the position of the orchestra Eruditio Musica. In 1811 he established, with Johann Wilhelm Wilms and some others the series of Tuesday concerts. He died, aged 77, in Amsterdam.

Anton Fodor published three symphonies (Opp. 5, 12 and 19), eight piano concertos, and a considerable output of chamber music in which the piano plays the leading role, as well as songs on Dutch texts. His opera, has been lost.

Notes

External links 

1768 births
1846 deaths
19th-century composers
Dutch composers
Dutch pianists
Dutch conductors (music)
Male conductors (music)
Members of the Royal Netherlands Academy of Arts and Sciences
People from Venlo
19th-century Dutch male musicians